The Roman Catholic Archdiocese of Agra is a Latin Metropolitan archdiocese in northern India's Uttar Pradesh state. It comproses the following districts in Uttar Pradesh: Agra, Aligarh, Auraiya, Budaun, Bulandshahr, Etah, Etawah, Farrukabad, Firozabad, Gautambudha Nagar, Hathras, Kannauj, Mainpuri, Mathura and in Rajasthan: Bharatpur and Dholpur.

Its cathedral episcopal see is located in the city of Agra.

History 
 Established in 1784 as Mission “sui iuris” of Hindustan, on territory split off from the Apostolic Vicariate of Great Mogul
 Promoted in 1820 as Apostolic Vicariate of Tibet-Hindustan, hence entitled to a titular bishop.
 1846: Promoted as Diocese of Agra, ceasing its missionary status
 1 September 1886: Promoted as Metropolitan Archdiocese of Agra, yet remains dependent on the Roman Congregation for the Evangelization of Peoples.

Ordinaries 
(all Latin Rite, till 1982 missionary members of a Latin Congregation)Ecclesiastical Superiors of Hindustan 
(not available : 1784 - 1820)

Apostolic Vicars of Tibet-Hindustan 
 Zenobio Benucci, Capuchin Franciscans (O.F.M. Cap.) (29 Aug 1820 – death 24 Jun 1824), Titular Bishop of Thermæ (29 Aug 1820  – 24 Jun 1824)
 Antonio Pezzoni, O.F.M. Cap. (27 Jan 1826 – retired 1841), Titular Bishop of Hesbon (27 Jan 1826 – death 13 Oct 1844)

Apostolic Vicars of Agra
 Giuseppe Antonio Borghi, O.F.M. Cap. (1842 – 12 Jun 1849), succeeding as former Coadjutor Vicar Apostolic of Tibet-Hindustan (14 Aug 1838 – 1842), remaining Titular Bishop of Bethsaida (14 Aug 1838  – 5 Nov 1849); later Bishop of Cortona (Italy) (5 Nov 1849 – death 31 Jul 1851)
 Gaetano Carli, O.F.M. Cap. (12 Jun 1849 – retired 7 Dec 1856?), succeeding as former Coadjutor Vicar Apostolic of Agra (23 Aug 1842  – 12 Jun 1849), remaining Titular Bishop of Halmiros (23 Aug 1842 – 1887)
 Angelicus Bedenik, O.F.M. Cap. (1 Jun 1861 – death 2 Nov 1866), Titular Bishop of Leuca (1 Jun 1861  – 2 Nov 1866)
 Michelangelo Jacobi, O.F.M. Cap. (9 Feb 1868  – 1 Sep 1886 see below), Titular Bishop of Pentacomia (9 Feb 1868  – 1 Sep 1886)

Metropolitan Archbishops of Agra 
 Michelangelo Jacobi, O.F.M. Cap. (see above 1 Sep 1886 – death 14 Oct 1891)
 Emmanuel Alfonso van den Bosch, O.F.M. Cap. (2 January 1892 – 27 April 1897), previously Bishop of Lahore (Pakistan, then also British India) (21 Nov 1890  – 2 Jan 1892); emeritate as Titular Archbishop of Parium (27 Apr 1897  – 17 Oct 1921)
 Charles Joseph Gentili, O.F.M. Cap. (27 August 1898 – death 6 January 1917), previously Bishop of Allahabad (India) (29 Mar 1897  – 27 Aug 1898)
 Angelo Raffaele Bernacchioni, O.F.M. Cap. (7 August 1917 – death 21 August 1937) 
 Evangelista Latino Enrico Vanni, O.F.M. Cap. (21 August 1937 – 1956), succeeding as former Coadjutor Archbishop of Agra (India) (1930 – 21 Aug 1937); previously Apostolic Vicar of Arabia (United Arab Emirates) (15 Apr 1916 – 1925) & Titular Archbishop of Tenedus (15 Apr 1916  – 21 Aug 1937); emeritate as Titular Archbishop of Bizya (1956 – 9 May 1962)
 Dominic Romuald Basil Athaide, O.F.M. Cap. (29 February 1956 – death 26 June 1982)
 Cecil DeSa (11 November 1983 – retired 16 April 1998), previously Bishop of Lucknow (India) (5 Jun 1971  – 11 Nov 1983)
 Vincent Michael Concessao (5 November 1998 – 7 September 2000), previously Titular Bishop of Mascula (3 Feb 1995  – 5 Nov 1998) & Auxiliary Bishop of Delhi (India) (3 Feb 1995  – 5 Nov 1998); later Vice-President of Catholic Bishops’ Conference of India (2000 – 2004), Metropolitan Archbishop of Delhi (7 Sep 2000  – 30 Nov 2012), Vice-President of Conference of Catholic Bishops of India (2007 – 2011)
 Oswald Gracias (7 September 2000 – 14 October 2006), also Second Vice-President of "Vox Clara" Committee (2002.04 – ...), President of Conference of Catholic Bishops of India (2005 – 12 Jan 2011); previously Titular Bishop of Bladia (28 Jun 1997  – 7 Sep 2000) & Auxiliary Bishop of Bombay (India) (28 Jun 1997  – 7 Sep 2000); later Metropolitan Archbishop of Bombay (India) (14 Oct 2006 – ...), created Cardinal-Priest of S. Paolo della Croce a Corviale (24 Nov 2007 [10 May 2008] – ...), Vice-President of Catholic Bishops’ Conference of India (19 Feb 2008  – 1 Mar 2010), President of Catholic Bishops’ Conference of India (1 Mar 2010  – 12 Feb 2014), President of Federation of Asian Bishops’ Conferences (21 Oct 2011 [1 Jan 2012] – ...), President of Conference of Catholic Bishops of India (2013.02 – ...), Member of Council of Cardinals to assist in the governance of the Universal Church and to reform the Roman Curia (13 Apr 2013 – ...)
 Albert D’Souza (16 Feb 2007 – 12 Nov 2020), also Secretary General of Catholic Bishops’ Conference of India (2012.02 – ...); previously Bishop of Lucknow (India) (21 Nov 1992  – 16 Feb 2007)
 Raphy Manjaly (12 Nov 2020 - present) previously  Bishop of Allahabad (India) (17 Oct 2013 – 12 Nov 2020)

Province 
Its ecclesiastical province comprises the Metropolitan's own Archdiocese and the following Suffragan bishoprics, mostly  Latin and two East Syriac Rite:
 Roman Catholic Diocese of Ajmer
 Roman Catholic Diocese of Allahabad
 Roman Catholic Diocese of Bareilly
 Roman Catholic Diocese of Jaipur
 Roman Catholic Diocese of Jhansi
 Roman Catholic Diocese of Lucknow
 Roman Catholic Diocese of Meerut
 Roman Catholic Diocese of Udaipur
 Roman Catholic Diocese of Varanasi
 Syro-Malabar Catholic Diocese of Bijnor
 Syro-Malabar Catholic Diocese of Gorakhpur

Parishes 

 Cathedral of Imm. Conception 	
 St. Mary’s Church, Agra
 St. Patrick’s Church, Agra 	
 St. Thomas Church, Agra, Sikandra
 Our Lady of Fatima Mission, Ajaynagar
 Holy Family Mission, Alampur Hauz
 St. Fidelis’ Church, Aligarh 	
 St. Michael’s Mission, Anupnagar 	
 St. Francis Mission, Auraiya 	
 Our Lady of Rosary Mission, Bastar 	
 St. Peter’s Church, Bharatpur 	
 St. Peter’s Mission, Bhimnagar
 Catholic Church, Budaun 	
 St. Gonsalo Garcia Church, Bulandshahr 	
 St. Paul’s Catholic Church, Chhibramau 
 Our Lady of Pilar Church, Dholpur 	
 St. Joseph’s Mission, NTPC, Dibyapur 	
 St. Francis Xavier Church, Etah 	
 Christ Church, Etawah 	
 St. Anthony’s Church, Fatehgarh 	
 St. John’s Church, Firozabad 		
 St. Joseph’s Church, Greater Noida
 St. Francis’ Church, Hathras 	
 St. Joseph’s Church, Jahangirabad
 Nishkalanka Mata Mission, Jaith 	
 St. Peter's Mission, Jaswant Nagar
 St. Mathew's Mission, Kannauj 	
 St. Joseph’s Church, Kasganj 	
 St. Anthony’s Church, Khora 	
 St. Theresa’s Church, Kosi Kalan
 St. Thomas’ Mission, Mainpuri 
 Sacred Heart Church, Mathura
 St. Mary's Church, Noida 	
 St. Dominic's Mission, Shikohabad
 Holy Family Church, Tundla

See also
 Diocese of Agra (Church of North India)

References

Sources and external links
 GCatholic.org, with incumbent biography links
 Catholic Hierarchy
 

Roman Catholic dioceses in India
Agra
Christianity in Uttar Pradesh
Religious organizations established in 1784
1784 establishments in Asia